Sinking of the van der Wijck (Indonesian: Tenggelamnya Kapal van der Wijck) is a 2013 Indonesian romantic drama film directed by Sunil Soraya and written by Imam Tantowi and Dhony Dirgantoro. Starring  Herjunot Ali, Pevita Pearce, and Reza Rahadian, the film based on Hamka's novel, Tenggelamnya Kapal van der Wijck, and released in theaters on 19 December 2013.

Cast 
 Herjunot Ali as Zainuddin
Pevita Pearce as Nurhayati
 Reza Rahadian as Aziz
 Randy Danistha as Muluk
 Arzetti Bilbina as Muluk's mother
 Kevin Andrean as Sophian
 Jajang C. Noer as Mande Jamilah
 Niniek L. Karim as Mak Base

Release 
Tenggelamnya Kapal Van der Wijck was the highest grossing Indonesian film of 2013 with over 1.7 million admissions. The film was nominated for five awards including, Best Actor in Leading Role for Herjunot Ali, Best Actor in a Supporting Role for Reza Rahadian, and Best Adapted Screenplay, and won one award for Best Visual Effects in the 2014 Indonesian Film Festival. The extended version, which ran for 3 hours and 30 minutes, was released in September 2014.

References

2013 films
2013 romantic drama films
Indonesian romantic drama films